Donald Mounger Collier (October 17, 1928 – September 13, 2021) was an American actor best known for Western films and NBC television shows such as The High Chaparral, Bonanza, Gunsmoke, and Outlaws as Marshal Will Foreman.

Early years
Collier was born on October 17, 1928, in Santa Monica, California. He worked as a geologist, a logging hand, a ranch hand, and a surveyor and served in both the Navy and the Merchant Marine. After his naval service, Collier worked as an extra in a few films before attending Hardin–Simmons College on an athletic scholarship. He did not return to school after his freshman year, but he later studied geology at Brigham Young University.

Career
For about three years, Collier enhanced his acting skills through work with a drama group headed by Estelle Harman. He found favor with directors and producers because his ranch-hand background enabled him to do his own fighting and riding.

On television, Collier portrayed Sam Butler in The High Chaparral, deputy Will Foreman in Outlaws, and William Tompkins in The Young Riders. He also appeared in the miniseries The Winds of War and War and Remembrance. His films included El Dorado, Tombstone, The War Wagon, and The Undefeated.

In the 1970s, Collier began making television  commercials, including one for Hubba Bubba bubble gum that had him portraying the Gum Fighter for eight years. In addition to his work in the United States, he made commercials in Australia.

Later in his career, Collier narrated The Desert Speaks, a series of documentaries for the University of Arizona, appeared at Western festivals, and presented the one-man stage performance Confessions of an Acting Cowboy.

The DVD Don Collier: Confessions of An Acting Cowboy was released in 2020.

Personal life and death 
Collier's marriage to Holly Hire, a casting director, ended with her death in 2012. He had four children. He died from lung cancer in Harrodsburg, Kentucky, on September 13, 2021, at the age of 92.

References

External links

1928 births
2021 deaths
20th-century American male actors
American male film actors
American male television actors
Male actors from California
Male Western (genre) film actors
Western (genre) television actors
Male actors from Santa Monica, California
Deaths from lung cancer in Kentucky
Military personnel from California